2DU is an Australian radio station serving the Dubbo region. It was opened in July 1936.

References

Radio stations in New South Wales
Radio stations established in 1936
News and talk radio stations in Australia
Classic hits radio stations in Australia
Broadcast Operations Group

External links
Official web site
Official web site